Lenka Koloušková (born on 3 March 1967 in Šumperk) is a Czech sport shooter. She competed in rifle shooting events at the 1988 Summer Olympics and the 1992 Summer Olympics.

Olympic results

References

1967 births
Living people
ISSF rifle shooters
Czech female sport shooters
Shooters at the 1988 Summer Olympics
Shooters at the 1992 Summer Olympics
Olympic shooters of Czechoslovakia
People from Šumperk
Sportspeople from the Olomouc Region